Clelia equatoriana, commonly known as the  equatorial mussarana, is a species of snake in the family Colubridae. The species is endemic to southeastern Central America and northwestern South America.

Geographic range
C. equatoriana is found in Costa Rica, Panama, Colombia, and Ecuador.

Description
C. equatoriana has 17 rows of dorsal scales at midbody (C. clelia has 19).

References

Further reading
Amaral A (1924). "New genus and new species of South American snakes contained in the United States National Museum". J. Washington Acad. Sci. 14: 200–202. (Barbourina, new genus, p. 201; Barbourina equatoriana, new species, pp. 201–202).

Mussuranas
Clelia
Snakes of Central America
Snakes of South America
Reptiles of Colombia
Reptiles of Costa Rica
Reptiles of Ecuador
Reptiles of Panama
Reptiles described in 1924